Auryn (stylized as AURYN) was a 5-member British-Spanish boy band founded in 2009. Signed to Warner Music, they sang in English and Spanish.

Members
The band is made up of five members that appeared previously on various talent show series in Spain. Various members of the band have taken part at different occasions in contests like Factor X, Veo Veo, La Batalla de los Coros and at Junior Eurovision Song Contest qualifications. Dani Fernández represented Spain in the Junior Eurovision Song Contest 2006.

Blas Cantó and Dani Fernández have studied trumpet and piano at musical conservatories / schools. Carlos Marco has studied vocal techniques at "Escuela Orfeo" in Alicante. Álvaro Gango has taken part in gospel and classical choirs and has worked as actor and David Lafuente has learned in musical bands.
 Blas Cantó Moreno (born in Ricote, Murcia, 26 October 1991)
 Daniel Fernández Delgado (born in Alcázar de San Juan, Ciudad Real, 11 December 1991)
 Alvaro Garcia-Gango Guijarro (born in Alcalá de Henares, Madrid on 2 October 1989)
 David Martin Lafuente (born in Pinos Puente, Granada on 3 May 1988)
 Carlos Perez Marco (born in Alicante, 4 February on 1991)

Destino Eurovisión 2011

Auryn  gained great popularity particularly after they took part in Destino Eurovisión, the selection process to represent Spain in Eurovision Song Contest 2011 reaching the final 3. In Heat 1 held on 28 January 2011, where contestants needed to perform an earlier Eurovision song, they sang a cover of "Fly on the Wings of Love" from the Olsen Brothers (the Eurovision 2000 winner for Denmark). They qualified to the next round by televoting. In the semi-final round held on 11 February 2011, contestants had to pick another Eurovision classic, they sang "Eres tú" originally by Mocedades that finished runner-up in Eurovision 1973 for Spain. They qualified by a decision of the jury to the Finals where they were one of the Top 3, the other acts being Lucía Pérez and Melissa. Each act had to sing three original songs, with the jury picking one original song from each artist. Auryn sang "Evangeline", "El sol brillará" and "Volver". The latter was picked as their final song. Eventually, the Spanish qualifying entry for Eurovision 2011 went to Lucía Pérez and her song "Que me quiten lo bailao".

Career
When the band was formed in 2009, they first gained attention through their online postings on YouTube including covers for Rihanna's "Umbrella" and Los Secretos' "Déjame". That was followed by an appearance on Destino Eurovisión 2011 (see above) where they finished in the Final 3, but failed to qualify for Eurovision 2011.

Based on the popularity they achieved, the band released their first single "Breathe in the Light" later in 2011 as well as their debut album Endless Road 7058 in 2012 both reaching the top 10 of the singles and album chart respectively. It won the "Best New Album" award at Televisión Española (TVE). Also spawning three top 10 singles, their follow-up album is Anti-Heroes was released in 2013 and went straight to number one on the album chart and has been certified platinum. Their third album "Circus Avenue" was preceded by the group's first number one single "Puppeteer" and reached number one on the album chart where it stayed for 5 consecutive weeks. The group released their fourth album "Ghost Town" in December 2015, seven months before going on hiatus.

Origin of the name
The band's name refers to the fictional talisman AURYN from Michael Ende book The Neverending Story, being two mythological serpents, symmetrical, that bite at each other's tails. The popular charm, when worn, allegedly gives the wearer the opportunity to fulfill all his wishes. Since the original word AURYN always appears in the book in all capitals, the band insists on naming its album titles in all capitals as well.

Solo projects
As the band went into hiatus in 2016, various members of the band launched solo projects. Blas Cantó signed to Warner Music Spain released his debut solo single "In Your Bed". They officially announced the breakup on 28 July 2016.

Discography
Studio albums

Singles

Other releases
 2011: "Volver" (Destino Eurovisión 2011)
 2011: "Evangeline" (Destino Eurovisión 2011)
 2011: "El sol brillará" (Destino Eurovisión 2011)

CD/DVDs
 2012: Endless Road, 7058
 2013: Anti-Heroes
 2014: Circus Avenue

Awards and nominations

References

External links
 
 YouTube

Spanish musical groups
Spanish boy bands
English-language singers from Spain
MTV Europe Music Award winners